Otter Creek Township is the name of two townships in Indiana:
Otter Creek Township, Ripley County, Indiana
Otter Creek Township, Vigo County, Indiana

Indiana township disambiguation pages